Adah Almutairi (born November 1, 1976) is a Saudi American scientist and professor at University of California, San Diego (UCSD). Her work focuses on nanomedicine, nanotechnology, chemistry and polymer science.  Forbes has described her as one top ten most influential female engineers in the world.

Early life and education

Almutairi was born on November 1, 1976, in Portland, Oregon, United States to Saudi parents. Prof. Almutairi lived in Jeddah, on the coast of the Red Sea of Saudi Arabia for 9 years before moving to Los Angeles in 1996 to begin her higher education. She graduated from Occidental College with a bachelor's degree in Chemistry in 2000.

Academic career 
She obtained her Ph.D. in materials chemistry from University of California, Riverside, with a focus on electron delocalization and molecular structure in 2005. She completed her Postdoctoral Studies in Chemistry and Chemical Engineering at the University of California, Berkeley, from 2005 to 2008. At Berkeley Almutairi worked with Jean Fréchet where she developed several nanoprobes for in vivo molecular imaging. She joined the University of California, San Diego in 2008, and has been there ever since, as the director of excellence in Nanomedicine.

Her academic contributions throughout her career to Pharmaceutical Sciences are listed below:
 Introduced the first polymeric nanoparticle to release drug in response to  Concentrations of hydrogen peroxide characteristic of inflammation.
 Developed the first near infrared-degradable polymer, which enables Precise remotely controlled delivery of molecules.
 Created an activatable MRI agent with unprecedented contrast between "on" and "off" states.
 Designed a polymeric nanoparticle that enables delivery to the cytosol by rapid degradation upon exposure to mild acid.
Almutairi is a 2016 Kavli Fellow and has received numerous honors and awards such as the NIH director's new innovator award in 2009 for her work on "Chemically Amplified Response Strategies for Medical Sciences".  Almutairi's groundbreaking work was highlighted by U.S. NIH director Francis Collins to Congress as one of the 4 most important American technology breakthroughs of the year 2012. Almutairi is the Founder of eLux Medical Inc. .

Patents 

 2014: Polymeric nano-carriers with a linear dual response mechanism and uses thereof
 2014: Nanocarriers with multi-photon response elements
 2015: Polymeric nanocarriers with light-triggered release mechanism
 2015: Light degradable drug delivery system for ocular therapy
 2016: Biocompatible polymeric nanoparticles degrade and release cargo in response to biologically relevant levels of hydrogen peroxide
 2016: Fine spatiotemporal control of fat removal using NIR light
 2016: Selective fat removal using NIR light and nanoparticles
 2016: Selective fat removal using photothermal heating
 2016: Single step polymerization of covalently bound multilayer matrices
 2019: Selective fat removal using photothermal heating

Awards and honors
Almutairi has received several awards for her contributions in science and medicine including:
 NIH director's new innovator Award in 2009.
 phRMA foundation award in 2009.
 Thiema chemistry journal award in 2009.
 Young Investigator Award, World Biomaterials Congress, Chengdu, China in 2012.
Kavli Fellow, 2016  U.S. National Academy of Sciences

References

Scientists from Portland, Oregon
Occidental College alumni
Living people
University of California, Riverside alumni
21st-century American chemists
American women chemists
Saudi Arabian women chemists
American women engineers
Saudi Arabian women engineers
American chemical engineers
Women chemical engineers
21st-century chemists
21st-century engineers
21st-century women engineers
1976 births
American people of Saudi Arabian descent
21st-century American women scientists